Ingrid Moe (born 15 November 1984) is a Norwegian racing cyclist, who last rode for UCI Women's Team . She rode in the women's road race event at the 2017 UCI Road World Championships.

References

External links

1984 births
Living people
Norwegian female cyclists
Sportspeople from Bergen
21st-century Norwegian women